Phallus tenuissimus is a species of fungus in the stinkhorn family. Found in Jingdong Yi Autonomous County in Yunnan, China, it was described as new to science in 2005. Its spores are cylindrical, and measure 3.3–4 by 1.1–1.4 µm. The authors place it in the section Reticulati of genus Phallus on account of its reticulate cap.

References

External links

Fungi described in 2005
Fungi of Asia
Phallales